Lynne Irene Spears ( Bridges; born May 4, 1955) is an American author and mother of pop singer Britney Spears, as well as producer Bryan Spears and actress/country singer Jamie Lynn Spears.

Biography

Early life and family
Lynne Irene Bridges was born on May 4, 1955, in Magnolia, Mississippi, to Lilian Irene Portell (1924–1993), a British woman of English and Maltese descent, and Barney O'Field Bridges (1919–1978), an American G.I. In 1945, her parents met and married in Portell's native London. Spears' maternal great-grandfather, Edward Portell, had immigrated to the United Kingdom from Malta while the country was a colony of the British Empire. Spears has an older brother, Barry "Sonny" Bridges (born 1951). Their older sister, Sandra Bridges Covington (1947–2007), died of ovarian cancer.

In July 1976, she married Jamie Spears. They divorced in May 2002 and reconciled without remarrying around 2010. They were seen still united in 2014, but were evidently completely separated by 2020. They have three children: son Bryan Spears (born 1977) and daughters Britney Spears (born 1981) and Jamie Lynn Spears (born 1991). They also have five grandchildren: grandsons Sean Preston Federline (born 2005) and Jayden James Federline (born 2006) from Britney, granddaughters Maddie Briann Aldridge (born 2008) and Ivey Joan Watson (born 2018) from Jamie Lynn, and Sophia Alexandra Spears (born 2011) from Bryan.

Spears owned and operated a day care in Kentwood, Louisiana and later worked as a school teacher.

Books
Spears has co-written two books with her daughter Britney. The first, Heart to Heart, was published in 2000 as a biographical book about Britney. A Mother's Gift was a novel released in 2001 and has been adapted into a TV movie, Brave New Girl. A 2008 memoir, Through the Storm: A Real Story of Fame and Family in a Tabloid World, followed, detailing the public scrutiny that the Spears family faced after Britney's mental breakdown and Jamie Lynn's teen pregnancy.

Personal life
Spears is a devout Christian, and openly discussed this in her memoir. She attended First Baptist Church in Kentwood, Louisiana with her family but she has been identified as a Catholic alongside her youngest daughter Jamie Lynn and two of her granddaughters, Jamie Lynn's daughters. Spears' older daughter, Britney, announced on August 5, 2021, that she also became initially Catholic. However, by September 5, 2022, Britney would identify herself as an atheist.

In November 2021, Spears requested $650,000 in legal fees from Britney's estate.

References

External links

1955 births
Living people
20th-century American writers
21st-century American novelists
20th-century American women writers
21st-century American women writers
American people of English descent
American people of Maltese descent
People from McComb, Mississippi
People of Maltese-British descent
People from Kentwood, Louisiana
Lynne
Southern University alumni
Alumni of the University of Reading
American Roman Catholics
Converts to Roman Catholicism
Converts to Roman Catholicism from Baptist denominations
Catholics from Louisiana
Catholics from Mississippi